Nuuk Tourist Office is a landmark in Nuuk, Greenland, built in 1992 to house the headquarters of the new National Tourist Board of Greenland. It was built to not only provide information to tourists but as an attraction, with a fake Christmas tree and an extremely large postal box.

See also
Visitor center

References

Buildings and structures in Nuuk
Government buildings completed in 1992